Mission: Impossible is an American espionage television series that aired on CBS from September 1966 to March 1973. It was revived in 1988 for two seasons on ABC. It also inspired the series of theatrical motion pictures starring Tom Cruise beginning in 1996.

Created and initially produced by Bruce Geller, the show chronicled the exploits of a small covert team of secret government agents, known as the Impossible Missions Force, and their sophisticated methods of deceiving, manipulating and thwarting hostile Iron Curtain governments, third world dictators, corrupt industrialists, and crime lords, among others. In the first season, the team is led by Dan Briggs (played by Steven Hill); Jim Phelps (played by Peter Graves) takes charge for the six remaining seasons. Briggs and Phelps usually assemble the same core team of agents, all of whom have careers and some degree of celebrity outside of espionage. The team is occasionally supplemented by other specialists.

The series was financed and filmed by Desilu Productions.

Overview 
The identity of the agency that oversees the Impossible Missions Force (IMF) is never revealed. Only rare cryptic bits of information are ever provided, such as in the third-season mission "Nicole", where the IMF leader states that his instructions come from "Division Seven". It is suggested that the IMF is an independent agency of the United States government. This is implied by the fact that, for several years, towards the end of the taped briefing messages, the narrator states:  "As always, should you or any of your IM force be caught or killed, the Secretary will disavow any knowledge of your actions", or words to that effect.

No main character was ever killed or disavowed in the original series, but a character could disappear between episodes or seasons without explanation or acknowledgment. A main character was killed in the 1980s revival, however. Mimi Davis is the only character whose recruitment as an IMF agent was shown on screen, although such a scene was filmed for Dana Lambert (Lesley Ann Warren) and discarded.

Inspiration
A key inspiration for Geller was the 1964 Jules Dassin film Topkapi, innovative for its methodical depiction of an elaborate heist. Geller switched the focus away from criminals, but kept Dassin's style of minimal dialogue, prominent music scoring and clockwork-precision execution by a team of diverse specialists. Several episodes show close-up shots of an agent's wristwatch to convey the suspense of working on a deadline.

Geller also insisted on minimal character development because he felt that seeing the characters as blank slates would make them more convincing in undercover work, and because he wanted to keep the focus on the caper. Geller vetoed attempts by writers to develop the main characters. Even after Geller was removed from the show, the agents were rarely if ever seen in their "real" lives, and had only one scene where they interacted at Phelps' apartment.

The producers of Mission: Impossible were sued for plagiarism by the creators of a short-lived ABC show called 21 Beacon Street. The suit was settled out of court. Geller claimed never to have seen the earlier show; 21 Beacon Streets story editor and pilot scripter, Laurence Heath, later wrote several episodes of Mission: Impossible.

Writer William Read Woodfield was a fan of David Maurer's nonfiction 1940 book about con artists, The Big Con (also an unofficial inspiration for The Sting), and many episodes are strikingly similar to cons described in the book.

The tape scene is very similar to one described in the 1964 Nick Carter-Killmaster novel Saigon, published in December 1964 and repeated in the 1966 novel Danger Key (copyright registered in February 1966). In the novels, secret agent Carter receives a package from his superior which, when activated, plays a tape-recorded message that self-destructs after playing once.

IMF agents 

The IMF was initially led by Dan Briggs, played by Steven Hill. As an Orthodox Jew, Hill had to leave on Fridays at 4:00 p.m. to be home before sundown, and he was not available until after dark the next day. Although Hill's contract allowed for religious observances, the clause proved difficult to work around due to the production schedule, and as the season progressed, Briggs appeared less and less. Hill had other problems, as well. After cooperatively crawling through dirt tunnels and repeatedly climbing a rope ladder in the episode "Snowball in Hell", in the following episode ("Action!") he balked at climbing to the rafters via a 20-foot sound stage staircase and locked himself in his dressing room. Unable to come to terms with Hill, the producers re-shot the episode without him; another member of the team, Cinnamon Carter, listened to the taped message; the selected operatives' photos were displayed in "limbo"; and the team meeting was held in a different apartment. Briggs's presence in the five remaining episodes was kept to a minimum. As far as Hill's religious requirements were concerned, line producer Joseph Gantman simply had not understood what had been agreed to. He told author Patrick J. White, "'If someone understands your problems and says he understands them, you feel better about it. But if he doesn't care about your problems, then you begin to really resent him. Steven Hill may have felt exactly the same way."

Hill was replaced without explanation in the second season by Peter Graves (brother of Gunsmokes James Arness), in the role of Jim Phelps. Phelps remained the team's leader for the remainder of the original series as well as the 1988–1990 revival.

In theory, Briggs and Phelps are the only full-time members of the IMF. As the series was originally conceived, they would form teams composed of part-time agents from a variety of professions based on the particular skills required for the mission. In practice, however, Briggs and Phelps choose the same core group of three or four agents for every mission, occasionally supplemented by guest stars playing agents with unique skills.

The regular agent line-up during the first season consisted of:

 Cinnamon Carter (Barbara Bain), a top fashion model and actress
 Rollin Hand (Martin Landau), a noted actor, makeup artist, escape artist, magician, and "man of a million faces"
 Barnard "Barney" Collier (Greg Morris), a mechanical and electronics genius and owner of Collier Electronics
 William "Willy" Armitage (Peter Lupus), a world record-holding weight lifter

Bain and Landau were married in real life. Landau was cast as a guest star in the pilot episode with the understanding that he would be one of four or five rotating guest-star agents. His contract gave producers an option to have him "render services for (three or four) additional episodes". To fill the void left by Hill's Sabbath absences, the producers eventually struck a deal with Landau to appear in the remaining first season episodes. He was always billed as a "guest star" so he had the option to give notice to work on a feature film. Landau contractually became a series regular in season two.

Bain, who won the Emmy for her performances as Cinnamon Carter three years in a row, and Landau both left the series at the conclusion of the third season. Replacements often possessed the same skills as their predecessors. For example, "The Great Paris," Rollin Hand's replacement played by Leonard Nimoy in the fourth and fifth seasons, is also an actor, makeup artist, magician, and "master of disguise". Bain was replaced in season four by a series of guest stars, only one of whom made more than one appearance: Lee Meriwether as Tracey. Season five added Dana Lambert, played by stage and movie actress Lesley Ann Warren (billed as "Lesley Warren"). In seasons six and seven, the female member of the team was cosmetologist and mistress-of-disguise Lisa Casey (Lynda Day George), whose first name was only established in the 1988–1989 revival. During her maternity leave, Lynda Day George was replaced in a third of the season seven episodes by Mimi Davis, played by Barbara Anderson, who had been on Ironside.

Also seen in seasons five and six is Dr. Doug Robert, played by Sam Elliott (according to White, the character was introduced as a replacement for Peter Lupus as Willy, but the idea was dropped once the producers realized how popular Willy was with viewers).

Morris and Lupus were the only actors to last through the full run of the original series. Morris also appeared in two episodes of the revival series, in which the character's son, Grant Collier (played by Morris's real-life son, Phil Morris), is also an IMF agent.

Cold War subtext 
Although a Cold War subtext is present throughout the series, the actual Cold War between the United States and the Soviet Union is rarely mentioned over the course of the series. (See, for example, the mission objectives for "The Trial" and "The Confession" in season one.) However, in the early years, specific locations behind the Iron Curtain are named (such as Lubyanka prison in the episode "Memory"), and many of the targets appear to be leaders of fictional Slavic countries, including the "European People's Republic" and the "Eastern European Republic." Additionally, real languages spoken in Eastern Europe are used. In the season-one episode "The Carriers," one of the villains reads a book whose title is the (incorrect) Russian Na Voina (About War). Police vehicles are often labeled as such with words such as "poliiçia," and "poIiia," and a gas line or tank would be labeled "Gäz," which is a Romanian translation. This "language," referred to by the production team as "Gellerese," was invented specifically to be readable by non-speakers of Slavic languages, and was actually intended as a source of comic relief. Uniforms of the target regime frequently include peaked caps, jackboots, and Sam Browne belts, hinting at connections with Nazi Germany or the Warsaw Pact.

In 2004, Douglas Little of Clark University published a lengthy academic article explicitly linking the TV series to CIA history: "Mission Impossible: The CIA and the Cult of Covert Action in the Middle East".

Adversaries unrelated to the Cold War 

The IMF is also assigned to bring down politicians and dictators of Third World countries outside the Cold War. Practices such as slavery, which was still legal in some nations in 1966 ("The Slave"), and apartheid ("Kitara"), were targeted. The revival of the Nazi Party in Germany was targeted several times. Rollin Hand (played by Jewish actor Martin Landau) impersonated leading Nazi figures – Martin Bormann and Adolf Hitler. Other themes included corrupt Central or South American nations, as well as organized crime figures, corrupt businessmen, and politicians in the United States.

This mirrors actual events in the era involving the United States and regime change.

As noted in the reference work The Complete "Mission: Impossible" Dossier by Patrick J. White, many IMF missions were essentially assassinations in disguise. In the first-season episode "Memory",  the unspecified government agency behind the IMF has forbidden it to commit outright assassinations "as a matter of policy." This policy is not consistently followed; for example in "The Legend", Briggs' original plan is to personally shoot Nazi rallying-figure Martin Bormann, which is foiled by the discovery of a dummy and a tape recorder in the "man's" sick room. In other early-season episodes, for example "The Spy"  and the pilot episode, agents are shown shooting people when necessary (usually underlings or enemy soldiers). To get around this restriction, many missions instead involve the IMF setting up its targets to be killed by their own people or other enemies. A notable example is the second-season, two-part story "The Council" later released to European movie houses under the title Mission Impossible vs. the Mob.  Overall, however, gunplay is relatively rare from the IMF, as its methods are more sophisticated and subtle.

Fifth season 

During the fifth season, with Paramount executives having gained greater control, new producer Bruce Lansbury began to phase out international missions. These were more expensive to film, often requiring sets to be purpose-built, along with special costuming, etc., all of which was avoided with "domestic" settings. This would manifest itself the following year with the IMF frequently battling organized crime, though the fifth season still featured more international forays than not. The gangland bosses are usually associated with a criminal organization called the "Syndicate", a generic organization, or its franchises. When describing such assignments, the taped message usually notes that the target is outside the reach of "conventional law enforcement".

The objective of such missions is usually to obtain evidence that might be admissible in court, often taking the form of tricking the mobsters into making a confession while being recorded. Manipulating the targets into killing one another became much less common as well. Lansbury also attempted to replace Peter Lupus, who was expressing dissatisfaction with his part at this time, with Sam Elliott. Over the course of the fifth season, Lupus's William "Willy" Armitage appeared in 13 of 23 episodes, to the outrage of fans who demanded Armitage's return.  Elliott appeared in the first filmed episode of season six, but Lupus remained in the last two seasons, with Armitage being given a larger share of screen time and more demanding duties.

Format 

Mission: Impossible is noted for its format, which rarely changed throughout the series. Indeed, the opening scenes acquired a ritualistic feel, befitting the "quasi-official" aura the program sought for the clandestine operations.

Title sequence 
The title sequence began with the lighting of a fuse. The hand with the match was, until sometime in the sixth season, that of creator Bruce Geller; in the revival series, the hand belonged to Peter Graves, who was shown holding the match. The fuse burned from left to right across the screen over clips of scenes in the current episode. This was followed by lead actor credits. The show's iconic theme music played throughout the title sequence. In the fifth season, the series introduced a variation of the theme, coinciding with episodes featuring Dr. Doug Robert during that season. Though Robert did not appear in subsequent seasons, altered versions of the theme were used. The opening title sequences were created for each episode by optical effects artist Howard A. Anderson, Jr.

Tape scene 

Most episodes begin with Briggs or Phelps retrieving a hidden tape recorder and an envelope of photos and information that describes the mission. The recording almost always begins with "Good morning/afternoon/evening, Mr. Briggs/Phelps." (The only exception is the first-season episode "Action!", in which Briggs does not appear; Cinnamon Carter listens to the briefing.) The taped message usually continues,  "Your mission Dan/Jim, should you choose to accept it" or words to that effect, with a brief explanation of the mission's objective. At the conclusion, the listener is reminded, "As always, should you or any of your IM Force be caught or killed, the Secretary will disavow any knowledge of your actions."  The instructions on the tape were read by voice actor Robert Cleveland "Bob" Johnson. At the conclusion of the instructions, Phelps/Briggs is notified, "This tape will self-destruct in five [or, occasionally, "10"] seconds. Good luck, Dan/Jim." Smoke then rises from the recorder as the tape is automatically destroyed. Some early episodes depict Briggs applying a chemical to the tape and blowing air onto it, triggering a reaction that destroys the recording. This method was abandoned due to cost, and the effect was replicated by piping smoke through the recorder. The word "self-destruct" was coined by the show's writers, but became widely used.

A few episodes, mostly in the first season, deviated from the use of photos and a self-destructing tape in the mission briefing. The series pilot involved a phonograph record, which was delivered to Briggs in an airtight plastic envelope and which would "decompose one minute after the breaking of the seal" from exposure to air. A record used in another episode had to be played on a vintage phonograph, which had been rigged to scratch the record so badly as to render it unplayable once the briefing was complete. In another, Briggs received his instructions from a speaker in a drive-in movie theater. In a few instances, instructions at the end of the tape would ask Briggs/Phelps, "Please dispose of/destroy this recording in the usual manner/by the usual means." Briggs/Phelps would then toss it in an incinerator or use other means to destroy it. After the first year, an entire season's worth of "tape scenes" were usually filmed all at once prior to production of the rest of the episodes. The voice instructions were added later, and the cast and crew never knew which tape scene would appear with which episode until it was broadcast. Some tape scenes were reused, with only minor changes to various insert shots and Johnson's recorded voice over. In the first season, for example, the same tape scene was used for both "Wheels" and "Legacy". The only differences were that the tape gave a different set of instructions in each episode, and a different set of insert shots of the photographs that Briggs is viewing is used. The cost-saving practice of recycling tape scenes continued throughout the series run; generally, each season reused at least one tape scene. One particular tape scene, of Phelps finding a tape in a parking lot attendant's hut, was actually used in three widely scattered episodes: "The Astrologer", "Recovery", and "The Vault".

In the fifth season, the producers experimented with the format by sometimes eliminating the taped briefing (and/or the team meeting in Phelps's apartment), starting the episode with the mission already underway.

Dossier scene 

The tape scene was followed by what White refers to as the "Dossier Scene". Briggs or Phelps, in their apartment, retrieves an oversized, leather-bound folder from a locked drawer. The folder contains plastic-wrapped dossiers (usually featuring standard 8×10 "glossies") of the available IMF agents. Briggs/Phelps would toss the selected agents' dossiers onto a coffee table. According to White, most of the rejected dossiers were various series staffers and their spouses, including  Geller and his wife. A contemporary article in TV Guide claimed that many of the disregarded photos were of studio and network executives, and that it was considered a measure of one's status in the studio and network hierarchies to appear there, but White makes no such statement.

In early seasons, the agents selected often included guest stars playing agents with specific skills not possessed by the usual team. A doctor, particularly a specialist in a condition known to afflict the target, was a common "guest agent". In numerous early episodes, the IMF leader would choose only two or three team members, though at least one of the main credited cast members was always involved. In one episode, "Elena", the team consisted of Rollin Hand and Dr. Carlos Enero (guest star Barry Atwater). Almost as often, however, Briggs would choose all of the regulars, plus one, two, or even three others.

In later seasons, the team was more fixed, consisting of the regular cast and less dependent on guest agents. Numerous dossier scenes from the Peter Graves episodes feature Phelps thumbing through photographs only to unfailingly choose the series regulars. By the third season, the dossier scene had been deemed somewhat disposable, appearing only when needed to introduce a guest agent. The first mission without the dossier scene was the last mission of the second season, "The Recovery". The dossier scene frequently appeared in season four, due to the lack of a regular female team member in that season. It was dropped entirely as of season five.

In the pilot episode, the recorded message states that the team leaders have unlimited resources and wide discretion in choosing their team. "Memory" features a montage of Dan Briggs training a guest agent to assume the role he will play in the mission. "Old Man Out, Part 1" includes a scene of Briggs approaching an operative (played by Mary Ann Mobley) to recruit her, meeting with resistance before he finally convinces her to join the mission.

Apartment scene 

In the third segment of the opening act, called the "apartment scene" by White, the team would convene for their final briefing in the leader's apartment. Although the series was shot in color, the apartment had a black, white, and gray color scheme, such that the apartment was sometimes referred to off-camera as the black-and-white room. Steven Hill once suggested that an American flag be placed on a wall of Briggs' apartment, but Bruce Geller vetoed the idea to maintain the scheme. Two exceptions are the first-season episodes, "Operation Rogosh", when the team immediately springs into action to capture their target in a staged auto accident, and "Action!", where the team meeting took place in another apartment.

The apartment scene acted as a teaser. Team members would make vague references to preparations necessary for the mission's successful execution, while leaving most details undisclosed. It is never clear who devised the plan, although the team leader is often shown writing or making notes. Preparations and the necessary logistics were almost never shown, and only a short period of time is implied to have elapsed from the initial assignment until the team is in the field. Early episodes occasionally showed more of the preliminaries. This scene also demonstrated and established credibility for various gadgets or ploys that were key to the plan, such as a TV camera hidden in a brooch, a miniature radio-controlled hovercraft, a chess-playing computer, a "mentalist" or sleight-of-hand act, or a trained animal. In addition, this scene would establish, or at least hint at, the specialties and roles of any guest agents. Team members posed questions about aspects of the plan or why an alternative was not considered, providing the writers with an opportunity to preemptively explain plot holes. When summing up, Phelps often stressed the difficulties in the action they were about to undertake, or some key element of the plan vital to its success, such as a deadline by which the mission had to be completed.

According to White, the producers decided to phase out the tape recorder and apartment scenes and drop the dossier scene in the fifth season. By the end of that season, however, the tape and apartment scenes were restored, but the dossier scene was eliminated for the rest of the series run. This is White's version, but in fact episodes without the tape and/or the meeting scenes were few. The 1980s revival reinstated the "dossier scene" in the first episode, when Phelps selects his new team, but since the same team appeared in subsequent episodes, no other dossier scenes were made.

Plan 

The episode then depicted the plan being put into action with clockwork precision. This almost always involved elaborate and often multiple deceptions.
William Read Woodfield and Allan Balter served as story consultants for the first two seasons. According to White, Woodfield and Balter relied heavily on the Maurer book The Big Con for their inspiration. Hence, Briggs/Phelps became the "grifter-in-charge", Rollin Hand and Cinnamon Carter were highly effective "ropers", and Barney Collier and Willy Armitage were experts at building or equipping "big stores".

Certain team members, as masters of disguise, impersonate the target or someone connected to the target using realistic latex face masks and make-up. A few early season episodes showed the painstaking creation and application of these masks, usually by Rollin Hand. This was later omitted as the audience presumably became familiar with the team's methods. In the 1980s revival, the mask-making process involved a digital camera and computer, and was mostly automatic. In most cases, the guest star would play the role of both the original and the agent-imposter (ostensibly Rollin, Paris, or Casey). Some impersonations are done with the explicit cooperation of the person being impersonated. In some cases, the same actor playing the IMF agent also portrayed the person to be impersonated; this most frequently occurred during Martin Landau's tenure on the series, notably in the pilot, or supplied the voice of the person being impersonated by dubbing. Most episodes included a dramatic "reveal" (also referred to as the "peel-off") near the end of the episode in which the team member would remove the mask.

 Bona fides would be created to aid infiltration of the target government or organization. Various other technological methods were used, as well. Telephone or radio calls were often rerouted so the team could answer them. Faked radio or television broadcasts are common, as are elevators placed under the team's control. In some missions, a very elaborate simulated setting is created, such as a fake train or plane journey, submarine voyage, aftermath of a major disaster, or even the take over of the United States by a foreign government. In a particularly elaborate ploy, used on more than one occasion, the IMF convinces their target that several years had passed while the target was in a coma or suffering from amnesia. In another instance, the IMF even convinced its target, an aging mobster (played by William Shatner) that time has somehow been turned back more than 30 years and he is a young man again.

The plans often turn on elaborate psychology. The team usually arranged for a situation to arise that the target would react to in a predictable way, and the team would guide the outcome to the desired end.  Many plans simply cause the target to become confused or erratic or irrational, lose self-assurance, lose trust in subordinates or partners, etc., and fall back on predictable acts of desperation. In other cases the target's subordinates would replace the target and then act according to the team's predictions. These various ploys usually resulted in either information being revealed to the team, or the target's disgrace and discrediting, or both.

In many early episodes, the mission was to "neutralize" the target, and the target is ultimately killed by his superiors, staff, or rivals. This was rarely shown on screen; instead, the team would hear a gunshot as they decamped.  In later seasons, where the targets were usually organized-crime figures or similar, the mission goal is often simply to collect incriminating evidence not obtainable by "conventional law-enforcement agencies". The team is not above falsifying such evidence as a last resort.

Dramatic tension was provided by situations in which team members appear to be in danger of being discovered (especially before commercial breaks). Sometimes, unexpected events occur that force the team to improvise. On occasion, an outside party or one of the targets realizes what is happening and puts the plan at risk.

Conclusion 

In most cases, the action lasted right to the final seconds. A dramatic device frequently used at the end was the sound of a gunshot or a scream in the distance as the target is killed by his associates as the IMF team makes their getaway. Most often they leave in a nondescript panel truck, with the episode ending in a freeze frame.  On one particular episode, the team escapes in a van after leaving a secret underground enemy base that is destroyed by a series of explosions.  In the 1980s revival, this format was altered with the addition of a tag scene showing the IMF team regrouping (often still in disguise) and walking away. From the middle of the second season onwards, Jim Phelps often makes a quip.

Off-Book Missions 
In a few instances, a personal matter involving Briggs, Phelps or another IMF operative would result in an "off-book" mission. This first occurred in the opening season, when a "syndicate" boss kidnaps and threatens to kill the teen-aged daughter of a friend of Briggs unless he removes a grand-jury witness against the mobster from police protective custody. (How this man knew Briggs was capable of such a task was not explained.) In another instance, Phelps is captured and other team members rally to free him. The last such instance was near the end of the series, when the survivors of a previous IMF operation (season six's "Casino") recognize a vacationing Phelps from security camera photos and kidnap him to force his team to retrieve evidence that a plea-bargaining mobster is about to turn over to authorities. A mistake causes Cinnamon Carter to be exposed and captured by the villains, and Phelps concocts a plan to rescue her. One episode featured Phelps on a personal mission, where he visits his small hometown and learns that several of his childhood acquaintances have been murdered and the local law enforcement chief is unqualified to cope. In another episode, a friend of Phelps is framed for murder, giving Phelps only 24 hours to find the real killer, prove his friend's innocence, and save his life. On two occasions, he is captured and the team has to rescue him. In "Cat's Paw", team members volunteer to go against the organization responsible for murdering Barney's brother. Willy is shot and captured in one episode, and captured and tortured by a drug kingpin in another. Paris is kidnapped and brainwashed in an attempt to get him to kill Phelps. Jim and Rollin are on a hunting trip when Jim is taken mysteriously ill. (It turns out the residents of a "Norman Rockwell" town are hired assassins, who attempt to poison Phelps when he stumbles on their secret.) 
In the 1980s series, former IMF agent Barney Collier is framed for a crime he did not commit and the IMF team has to extricate him, leading to a reunion of Barney with his son and IMF agent Grant Collier (played by real-life father and son Greg and Phil Morris).

Filming locations 
The original series was mostly filmed on the Paramount lot, with location work around Hollywood and the Los Angeles Basin. The pilot episode was filmed at Mount St. Mary's College (Brentwood Campus) with special guest star Wally Cox. Other first season locations included the Natural History Museum of Los Angeles County ("Old Man Out") and the Los Angeles Union Pacific rail yard ("The Train"). Pasadena and the Caltech campus were common locations. Another noted location was the Bradbury Building, used in other films and series (from The Outer Limits to Blade Runner). One episode ("Trial by Fury") was filmed at the Stalag 13 set of Hogan's Heroes.

Cancellation 
Paramount had the option to cancel the series after the seventh season, and did so because it could make more money syndicating the show than producing new episodes.

Episodes

Music 

The main theme was composed by Argentine composer, pianist, and conductor Lalo Schifrin and is noted for being in  time. I did it for people from outer space who have five legs." The Morse code for M.I., the initials of Mission: Impossible, is two dashes followed by two dots, corresponding to the rhythm of the main theme. Schifrin wrote in his book Music Composition for Film and Television that he sometimes used Morse code for inspiration, to create unusual rhythms, for instance on the score for The Concorde ... Airport '79. "The Plot" was also composed by Schifrin, who scored three episodes in the first season and went on to score at least one or two episodes for most of the other seasons (season two is the only one to have no Schifrin-scored episodes, in part because he was helping to launch Geller's new series Mannix).

Schifrin was awarded two Grammys  at the 10th Grammy Awards for his work on the first season (Best Instrumental Theme and Best Original Score for a Motion Picture or TV Show). He was also nominated for two Emmys (for the first and third seasons). Among the other composers to work on the series were Jerry Fielding, Walter Scharf, Gerald Fried, Richard Markowitz, Benny Golson, Robert Drasnin, and Hugo Montenegro. Gerald Fried worked on Mission: Impossible concurrently while working on the Star Trek television series and re-used the infamous "Star Trek fight music" in several Mission: Impossible episodes.

The Best of Mission: Impossible – Then and Now 
Although two albums of re-recorded music from the original series had previously been released under Schifrin's name, Music from Mission: Impossible (Dot, 1967) and More Mission: Impossible (Paramount, 1968) the original scores were not commercially available until 1992 when GNP Crescendo released The Best of Mission: Impossible – Then and Now featuring five scores by Lalo Schifrin for the original series and five by John E. Davis for the revival (Schifrin also scored three episodes of the revival, including the premiere, but none were included).

 "Mission: Impossible – Main Title" 0:49
 "The Plot" (from "The Contender, Part 1") 0:51
 "Ready" (from "The Contender, Part 1") 3:12
 "Rollin" (from "The Contender, Part 1") 0:44
 "Time" (from "The Contender, Part 1") 0:46
 "Sleeping Phelps" (from "The Contender, Part 1") 1:11
 "More Plot" (from "Submarine") 2:39
 "Mission: Impossible Theme" (from "Submarine") 1:10
 "Bower Hotel" (from "The Killer") 1:55
 "Check Out Time" (from "The Killer") 2:45
 "The Trick" (from "The Killer") 2:16
 "Signal Light" (from "Takeover") 0:42
 "Kate Thomas" (from "Takeover") 1:28
 "Tape Machine" (from "Underground") 3:17
 "Good Job" (from "Underground") 0:47
 "Mission: Impossible – End Credit" 0:29
 "Mission: Impossible '88 – Main Title" 1:03
 "Tricky Ears" (from "The Plague") 0:38
 "This Is the Chase" (from "The Plague") 2:40
 "Croc Bait" (from "Bayou") 1:46
 "Not Worth It" (from "The Bayou") 3:38
 "Nice Boat" (from "The Cattle King") 0:59
 "Bait the Hook" (from "The Cattle King") 1:48
 "Hot Time" (from "The Cattle King") 0:44
 "I Guess It Is" (from "The Cattle King") 1:17
 "Freak Time" (from "The Cattle King") 1:34
 "Whacko Time" (from "The Cattle King") 1:42
 "Melt Down" (from "Deadly Harvest") 2:00
 "Framed" (from "Deadly Harvest") 2:05
 "Coffee" (from "Church Bells in Bogota") 1:16
 "Ring Around the Finger" (from "Church Bells in Bogota") 1:17
 "Mission: Impossible '88 – End Credit" 0:35
 "An Interview with Peter Graves" 14:55
 "Mission: Impossible Theme" – Israeli Philharmonic cond. Lalo Schifrin 6:07

Mission: Impossible – The Television Scores 
On July 28, 2015, La-La Land Records released a six-disc boxed set of the series' original music.

Theme from Mission: Impossible 

An electronic dance version of the theme by U2 bandmates Larry Mullen, Jr. and Adam Clayton was released in 1996 to coincide with the release of the first Mission: Impossible movie. The single was a success, and it was nominated for a Grammy Award for Best Pop Instrumental Performance (losing out to Béla Fleck and the Flecktones' "The Sinister Minister").

Awards

Emmy

Golden Globe

Edgar 
 Best Episode in a TV series – Jerome Ross, for "Operation Rogosh", 1967

Innovations and Influences 

Each episode's title sequence was composed of a number of very short clips of key scenes from the subject episode. Although this was, and remains, very rare for series television, it was already being done on I Spy, which like Mission opened with the lighting of a fuse. Several British teleseries produced by Gerry Anderson and his then wife Sylvia Anderson, the contemporaneous Thunderbirds (made in 1964) and the mid-1970s Space: 1999 (which starred Mission: Impossible alumni Martin Landau and Barbara Bain) amongst them, also showed clips in the opening sequence. The reimagined Battlestar Galactica TV series also used this device. The clips in the opening sequence were chosen to showcase dramatic moments in the upcoming mission, such as moments of surprise, moments of violence, or equipment in use. In particular, the first clip shown was often someone getting punched and/or knocked out. For the first two seasons, the closing credits showed clips from that mission in freeze frame. At the start of 1968, when Paramount took over from Desilu, the same clips were shown during the closing credits across episodes; later seasons eschewed that approach, featuring a freeze frame of the hand lighting the fuse.

Mission: Impossible is still recognized for its innovative use of music. Composer Lalo Schifrin wrote several distinctive pieces for the series. The visual cuts in the main title sequence were timed to the beats and measures of the theme tune—written in (unusual)  time. Most episodes included fairly long sequences showing the team members—particularly electronics expert Barney Collier—making technical preparations for the mission, usually to the accompaniment of another easily recognizable tune called "The Plot." Lalo Schifrin also wrote a theme for each main character, and the sound track for each episode incorporated variations of these throughout. Even when an episode's score is credited to some other composer, Desilu's music supervisor Jack Hunsacker would re-edit it, adding Schifrin melodies from the library.  The series had great impact on film and TV music. Before Mission: Impossible, a common compliment was along the lines of "the score worked very well but never got in the way or called attention to itself."  By contrast, Mission: Impossible was praised for the prominence of its music.

The original version of Mission: Impossible held the record for having the most episodes (171) of any English-language espionage television series for over 35 years (about 10 more episodes than its nearest rival, the UK-produced The Avengers).  Its record was broken during the eighth season of 24 in 2010.

Reruns of Mission: Impossible are still shown weekly on Me-TV affiliate TV stations. The original series' seven seasons are available on the Paramount+ paid streaming service and an its own dedicated "channel" on the Pluto TV free streaming service.

Broadcast history 

 Saturday at 9:00-10:00 PM on CBS: September 17, 1966—January 7, 1967
 Saturday at 8:30-9:30 PM on CBS: January 14—April 22, 1967
 Sunday at 10:00-11:00 PM on CBS: September 10, 1967—March 29, 1970 (the most frequent time slot)
 Saturday at 7:30-8:30 PM on CBS: September 19, 1970—March 17, 1971
 Saturday at 10:00-11:00 PM on CBS: September 18, 1971—December 9, 1972
 Friday at 8:00-9:00 PM on CBS: December 22, 1972—March 30, 1973

Home media
In North America, Mission: Impossible received limited VHS format release in the waning days of video cassettes: There was a subscription through Columbia House; GoodTimes Home Video issued a sell-through version of Episode 3, "Memory" (under the multiply erroneous title "Butcher of Balkins"); and Paramount Home Video released twelve two-episode volumes of "The Best of Mission: Impossible," six tapes at a time, in 1996 and 2000. Here are the episodes on the mentioned VHS releases:

Volume 1:
Episode 1: The Pilot
Episode 40: The Photographer

Volume 2:
Episode 13: The Carriers
Episode 35: The Seal

Volume 3:
Episode 37A: The Council: Part 1
Episode 37B: The Council: Part 2

Volume 4:
Episode 51: The Mercenaries
Episode 60: The Exchange

Volume 5:
Episode 62: The Mind of Stephan Miklos
Episode 67: Live Bait

Volume 6:
Episode 69: The Bunker: Part 1
Episode 70: The Bunker: Part 2

Volume 7:
Episode 2A: Old Man Out: Part 1
Episode 2B: Old Man Out: Part 2

Volume 8:
Episode 4: Operation Rogosh
Episode 23: The Train

Volume 9:
Episode 54: The Contender: Part 1
Episode 55: The Contender: Part 2

Volume 10:
Episode 76: The Controllers: Part 1
Episode 77: The Controllers: Part 2

Volume 11: 
Episode 105: The Killer
Episode 156: Cocaine

Volume 12:
Episode 162: The Puppet
Episode 168: The Pendulum

For laserdisc, Volumes 1-6 are available on that format, and in Japan's case, the first four seasons in their entirety are released onto the format by CIC video.

CBS DVD (distributed by Paramount Home Entertainment) has released all seven seasons of Mission: Impossible on DVD in Regions 1, 2 & 4. The episodes of the original series of Mission: Impossible on the CBS DVD/Paramount Pictures Home Entertainment DVD releases were presented digitally restored and remastered from the original film negatives for picture clarity and sound, and are also presented in its original broadcast presentation and order.

On December 11, 2012, Paramount released Mission: Impossible – The Complete Television Collection on DVD in Region 1.   The 56-disc collection features all 171 episodes of the series as well as bonus features.

On October 6, 2015, CBS Home Entertainment released a repackaged version of the complete series set, at a lower price.

On December 1, 2020, CBS Home Entertainment released a Blu-ray Disc version of the complete series set.

Parodies
Like many popular TV shows, "Mission: Impossible" has been spoofed:
On The Avengers 1967 episode "Mission... Highly Improbable" Steed is shrunk to 6 inches tall!
On Green Acres Lisa's Uncle Fydor claims he escaped from "Secret Police" by sking from Swiss Alps into Paris...In actual fact he is not fleeing "Secret Police" but the New York District Attorney's office for not paying alimony! Mr Haney tries to sell Mr Douglas a dog who can disguise himself as a chimpanzse  and Fydor flees the Douglas Farmhouse leaving a note that self destructs!
On the Sandy Duncan Show, Sandy played an actress with a bit part on Mission: Impossible who flubs her lines and ruins the scene. Peter Graves guest starred as himself.

In the Get Smart episode "Impossible Mission", Max gets his orders from a tape recorder which blows up a bus locker but not itself. The tape recording warns Smart that if he refuses to accept the mission he'll be fired. Then, in a parody of the "Dossier" scene, Smart rejects entertainer Tiny Tim and Alfred E. Newman of Mad Magazine.
Mad Magazine did a parody called "Mission: Ridiculous" in which Phelps and the IMF team pull off another Impossible mission even though the tape recording blows up a movie theater soda fountain.
In a Cracked magazine parody, the tape recorded message informs Phelps that he and his team are out of date and are all fired.
In the Josie and the Pussycats episode "Never Mind a Mastermind," Melody is mistaken for a spy and is given a pair of wooden shoes which deliver a secret message and then self destruct.
In the teaser of Inspector Gadget, the bumbling Gadget receives a message from the "Chief" which always self destructs the "Chief." 
In a parody of both Mission: Impossible and Get Smart on the cartoon spoof The X-s, spy Mr. X receives a shoe phone message which then self destructs.
The secret message tape scene has been parodied in other shows.  One example is in the animated TV series The Houndcats where, after the Chief gives the Houndcats their instructions, he warns them that the "message will self-destruct in five seconds" at which point the team panics as it then desperately tries to get rid of the message before it explodes.
In the SpongeBob SquarePants episode "Spy Buddies," SpongeBob and Patrick get an assignment through a recorded message in a Krabby Patty which self destructs.

Franchise successors

Television revival 

In 1980, media reports indicated that a reunion of the original cast was in the planning stages, for a project to be called Mission: Impossible 1980. Ultimately this project was delayed into 1983 (with the working title suitably updated repeatedly) before being canceled altogether due to one plot after another being deemed inappropriate and unacceptable. In 1984, another proposed Mission: Impossible reunion was to have been a theatrical film, titled Good Morning, Mr. Phelps (Mission: Impossible – The Movie). Ultimately, the proposed large budget sank this project.

In 1988, the American fall television season was hampered by a writers' strike that prevented the commissioning of new scripts. Producers, anxious to provide new product for viewers but with the prospect of a lengthy strike, went into the vaults for previously written material. Star Trek: The Next Generation, for example, used scripts written for an aborted Star Trek revival series proposed during the 1970s. The ABC network decided to launch a new Mission: Impossible series, with a mostly new cast (except for Peter Graves, who returned as Phelps), but using scripts from the original series, suitably updated. To save even more on production costs, the series was filmed in Australia; the first season in Queensland, and the second in Melbourne. Costs were, at that time, some 20 percent lower in Australia than in Hollywood. The new Mission: Impossible was one of the first American commercial network programs to be filmed in Australia.

According to Patrick White's book, the original plan was for the series to be an actual remake of the original series, with the new cast playing the same characters from the original series: Rollin Hand, Cinnamon Carter, et al. Just before filming began, White writes, the decision was made to rework the characters so that they were now original creations, albeit still patterned after the originals, with only Jim Phelps remaining unchanged.

The new series was not a hit, but it was produced cheaply enough to keep it on the ABC schedule. The new Mission: Impossible ultimately lasted for two years; the writers' strike was resolved quickly enough that only four episodes were actual remakes, which, along with the decision to change the character names and backgrounds, resulted in the series being considered a continuation of the original series, rather than simply a remake.

The original series formula described above was largely repeated in the second Mission: Impossible series of the 1980s, though the writers took some liberties and tried to stretch the rules somewhat. Most notably, by the time of the revival series, the Impossible Missions Force was no longer a small, clandestine operation, but larger in scale, with references now made to IMF divisions and additional teams similar to the one run by Phelps. One episode of the later series featured the only occasion in which a regular IMF agent was killed on a mission and subsequently disavowed. The 1980s series also had IMF agents using technology that nearly pushed the series into the realm of science fiction, such as one gadget that could record dreams, and another that allowed the IMF to change the surfaces (actually digital screens) of special playing cards to appear to be whatever cards the plan required.

The revived series included special appearances by several 1960s–70s IMF veterans, including Lynda Day George, and Greg Morris as Barney; Morris's son, Phil Morris, played Barney's son in the new series. Four guest stars from the original run all played targets here, Alex Cord, James Shigeta, and in the same episode, Barbara Luna and Australian Michael Pate.

Feature films 

In the early 1970s, the second season two-part story The Council was distributed to European movie houses, theatres and cinemas as a full-length feature film titled Mission: Impossible vs. the Mob.

A feature film based upon the series was first proposed in 1978, then to be made for TV. This was the first of several attempts through the 1980s, but no feature production materialized.

Later, six feature films were released, with two more in the works, produced by and starring Tom Cruise as team lead Ethan Hunt.

 Mission: Impossible (1996)
 Mission: Impossible 2 (2000)
 Mission: Impossible III (2006)
 Mission: Impossible – Ghost Protocol (2011)
 Mission: Impossible – Rogue Nation (2015)
 Mission: Impossible – Fallout (2018)
 Mission: Impossible – Dead Reckoning Part One (2023)
 Mission: Impossible – Dead Reckoning Part Two (2024)

IMF leader Jim Phelps, played by Peter Graves in the original series, has a supporting role in the first of these films, and is played by Jon Voight; he is also killed as a blatant traitor. None of the other films feature any characters from the television series.

In the early 2000s, Mission: Impossible was the only successful franchise of Paramount Pictures.

Video games 
 1990: Mission: Impossible. Published by Konami under its Ultra Games label for the Nintendo Entertainment System. The game is based on the 1988–1990 TV series.
 1998: Mission: Impossible. Published by Infogrames Entertainment for the Nintendo 64 and PlayStation. The plot is loosely based on the 1996 film.
 2000: Mission: Impossible. Published by Infogrames Entertainment for the Game Boy Color. This version is a loose adaptation of the 1998 game.
 2003: Mission: Impossible – Operation Surma. Published by Atari for the PlayStation 2, Xbox, GameCube, and Game Boy Advance. The game features an original story with characters from the film series, with Ving Rhames reprising his role as computer expert Luther Stickell.
 2011: Mission: Impossible – The Game. Paramount Pictures and Funtactix social game for Facebook, based on the first three Mission: Impossible films, with a later extension based on the fourth, release to promote the film Mission: Impossible – Ghost Protocol.

In 1979, game designer Scott Adams released Mission: Impossible, a text adventure game that placed the player in the role of a secret agent trying to save the world. Adams had failed to acquire the rights to the title, and the game was quickly reissued as Impossible Mission and later Secret Mission. Beyond the title and the name "Mr. Phelps" being mentioned on the tape recording at the beginning of the game, it had no overt connection to the TV series.

The 1984 computer game Impossible Mission also featured a story in which the player takes the role of a secret agent who must stop an evil genius, but it also has no overt connection to the Mission: Impossible franchise, although the game's designer Dennis Caswell claimed that the title was chosen because "it was, at least, somewhat descriptive, and the obvious allusion to Mission: Impossible was expedient."

Print 
Four original Mission: Impossible novels based upon the series were published in paperback by
Popular Library between 1967 and 1969:

 Mission: Impossible by Walter Wager as "John Tiger" * (1967)
 Mission: Impossible #2: Code Name: Judas by Jim Lawrence as "Max Walker" * (1968) 
 Mission: Impossible #3: Code Name: Rapier by Jim Lawrence as "Max Walker" (1968)
 Mission: Impossible #4: Code Name: Little Ivan by Walter Wager as "John Tiger" (1969)
 Whereas "John Tiger" was a pseudonym Walter Wager devised for himself (initially for what would become a series of seven original novels based on I Spy [1965 TV series], also published by Popular Library), the Walker by-line was, very briefly, a Popular Library "house" pseudonym, used only for the two M:I novels by Lawrence and subsequently for Michael Avallone's novelization of The Last Escape (1970 film).

In addition, two hardback novels for young readers were published by Whitman Books, both by Talmage Powell:

 Mission: Impossible: The Priceless Particle (1969)
 Mission: Impossible: The Money Explosion (1970)

Of the above, only the 1967 "John Tiger" novel featured the team as led by Dan Briggs; the rest all featured the Jim Phelps-era IMF.

Dell Comics published a Mission: Impossible comic book on a sporadic schedule that lasted from the mid-1960s to the early 1970s. Only five issues were published before the series was canceled. The first four issues were original publications; the fifth issue was a reprint of the first. In 1996, Marvel Comics published a single-issue Mission: Impossible comic which served as a prequel to the 1996 feature film.

In 1968, the GAF Corporation of Portland, Oregon/Paramount Films released a View-Master (21 stereo pictures in three round discs) with a 16-page story booklet: "Good morning Mr Phelps. The man you are looking at is Dr. Erich Rojak, the nuclear physicist who has been missing..."

Notes

Bibliography 
 .
 .

External links 

 
 .
 .
 .
 —memorabilia of the show, such as Dell comics, toys, posters &c.
 : database and cover gallery for the Dell comic book series.

 
1960s American crime television series
1966 American television series debuts
1970s American crime television series
1973 American television series endings
American action television series
CBS original programming
Dell Comics titles
Edgar Award-winning works
English-language television shows
Espionage television series
Television shows involved in plagiarism controversies
Primetime Emmy Award for Outstanding Drama Series winners
Television shows adapted into comics
Television series by CBS Studios
Television series by Desilu Productions
American television series revived after cancellation
Television shows filmed in Los Angeles
Television shows adapted into films